Electricity Commission may refer to:

 Central Electricity Regulatory Commission
 Electricity Commission (New Zealand)
 Electricity Commission (UK)
 Electricity Commission of New South Wales
 Electricity Supply Commission of Malawi
 Electricity and Gas Regulation Commission
 Federal Electricity Commission (Mexico)
 Maharashtra Electricity Regulatory Commission
 Nigerian Electricity Regulatory Commission
 State Electricity Commission (disambiguation), various entities
 State Electricity Commission of Victoria
 State Electricity Regulatory Commission
 State Energy Commission of Western Australia
 Trinidad and Tobago Electricity Commission

See also
 Electricity Authority (disambiguation)